Portington may refer to:

Places
Portington, Devon, England
Portington, East Riding of Yorkshire, England

People
William Portington (1544-1628), English carpenter